Bratz: Rock Angelz is a 2005 adventure video game based on the Bratz fashion doll line. It was developed by Blitz Games and published by THQ. It is based on the direct-to-video film Bratz: Rock Angelz and the toyline affiliated with the same name. The game was released on the PlayStation 2, GameCube, Game Boy Advance, and Microsoft Windows.

Gameplay

PlayStation 2 and GameCube
This version of the game is an open world adventure. The player controls one of the four Bratz girls (Yasmin, Cloe, Sasha, and Jade) who are attempting to launch their own teen magazine.

The player can explore 4 different locations; Stylesville (where the Bratz live), London, Paris, and the mansion. The objectives of the game are triggered when the player takes the correct Bratz girl to a speech bubble. During the game, coins called blings appear, which are coins for the Bratz girls. Each girl carries a cell phone, used to send messages between characters, check the amount of blings owned, and the location of the next objective. The phone's cover and ringtone can be changed. The player can also collect character token coins, used to buy movie clips. There are 25 available for each Bratz girl. The game also allows players to take pictures, and play minigames for extra money. The girls' make-up can be applied as the player wishes. The Bratz can be guided to shops, to buy the latest trends with their collected blings.

Minigames are activated by going to certain locations or talking to non-player characters. They include:

 Posing - The player must do the button combinations before the time runs out. In certain objectives, this minigame will be featured.
 Blown Away! - The player has to pick up pieces of paper that a person has dropped, and return them.
 Model Behavior! - The player has to take pictures in a photo booth.
 Rockin' Racerz - The player has to put on the Bratz girl's in-line roller skates, and grab the flags as fast as she can.

Game Boy Advance
The Game Boy Advance version uses the same story as the console version, but includes its own set of tasks. Progress is achieved by completing tasks in the home town of Stylesville. Halfway through the story, the girls travel to London, and prepare for a London show.

Microsoft Windows
The Microsoft Windows version of the game is different from the console version. It follows the story of the film.

There are nine objectives of the game. The odd-numbered objectives (chapter 1, 3, 5, 7, 9) are reflex-like mini-games, where the player has to do the tasks to collect points. Each mini-game has four rounds. When the player takes or misses the part, the player will gain lower points. At three misses, the player has to do the round again losing a number of points. With points, the player can unlock fashions for the Bratz girls, except in the final objective.

The even-numbered objectives (chapter 2, 4, 6, 8) are puzzle-like adventure games. The player has to play with the certain Bratz character and take things to solve a puzzle (for example give a camera to a colleague). The player can take pictures on those objectives to print them on the "Secrets" menu. Each adventure objective, the player has to design an article, logo, flyer, or poster to complete the part of the objective. The player can even print their own design. This part can be accessed on the "Secrets" menu.

When the player has beaten the game, they'll unlock a card game, called Top Trumps, which is similar to war. The player gets a card each turn with number totals on it. The player has to guess which number on the card is higher than the opponent's card. If their correct, they win the card. They go on playing until all 28 cards are in one players possession.

After Jade is rejected by Your Thing magazine the girls decide to make their own magazine to compete against Your Thing.

Reception

Notes

References

External links

2005 video games
Adventure games
Bratz video games
Game Boy Advance games
GameCube games
PlayStation 2 games
RenderWare games
THQ games
Open-world video games
Video games based on toys
Video games developed in the United Kingdom
Windows games
Video games featuring female protagonists
Video games set in London
Video games set in Paris
Blitz Games Studios games
Single-player video games